Belvédère Castle (French: Château du Belvédère; Dutch: Kasteel Belvédère) is a Belgian royal residence in Laeken, Belgium, which currently houses Albert II of Belgium and his wife, Queen Paola of Belgium.

History

Belvédère Castle was originally built in the 1780s, then the castle was bought by King Leopold II in 1867. The castle was meant for his sister Carlotta of Mexico, but she chose to live in Tervuren, which left Belvédère empty for a while.

In 1890, a fire broke out in the Royal Castle of Laeken, and King Leopold and his wife Marie Henriette of Austria moved to Belvédère while repairs took place. Once the repairs were finished, Leopold and Marie Henriette moved back to the Royal Palace, while Belvédère became the residence of their youngest daughter, Princess Clementine. She lived in Belvédère until her father died and she got married, leaving the castle for the Royal Palace. From there, the castle was occupied by different members of the royal court.

In 1958, it was used for exhibitions during the World Expo. All three of the royal couple's children were born and raised in Belvédère. After the couple became the monarchs of Belgium, they stayed at the castle instead of moving to the Royal Palace.

References

Castles in Belgium
Castles in Brussels
Buildings and structures completed in the 18th century
Royal residences in Belgium